Pramod Boro (born 1 March 1975) is an Indian politician serving as the president of The United People's Party Liberal (UPPL) since 25 February 2020 and Chief Executive Member of Bodoland Territorial Region, an autonomous region in Assam since 15 December 2020. He was the former president of All Bodo Students Union. Pramod Boro was born to Late Ghanashyam Boro. He is a resident of Tamulpur, Baksa district.

Political career 
After stepping down as the President from ABSU, he formally joined the United People’s Party Liberal (UPPL) on the 21st February 2020 at the Fourth Annual Convention held at Bijni, Chirang District of Assam; the UPPL was formed on 5 August in 2015 under the banner of Bodoland Movement groups at that time headed by Urkhao Gwra Brahma as the Founder President of the Party. 

Currently, Pramod Boro is the President of the United People's Party Liberal. Under his leader, UPPL has come to power in BTC Election, 2020 with alliance from BJP and GSP. He has become the Chief Executive Member (CEM) of the Bodoland Territorial Council (BTC) since 15 December 2020 by over throwing Shri Hagrama Mohilary.

Pramod Boro played a key role in signing the historic BTR Peace Accord, 2020, a tripartite accord signed in New Delhi, among all NDFB factions, ABSU and Government, while he was the President of ABSU.

Early life and education 
Pramod Boro hails from a very struggling agrarian family, had an economically challenging life during schooling and the time of his studies. He went to his village school during the lower primary stage and later on he went to Tamulpur HS School for his upper primary-Matriculation.

After completion of his Higher Secondary, he shifted to Guwahati College for higher studies, due to economic constraints he left college to earn a living, he used to work as a daily wager worker and rickshaw puller. He even went to coal mining at Meghalaya with his friends. After a few months, he returned to pursue his studies at Rangia College and completed his degree in 1994.After that he joined in politics in the name of ABSU.

Early political career

Bodoland Movement and Pramod Boro 
Since the time of his school days, he was active with the  Bodo Student's Union and their activities in various socia-political movements in Assam. During that time of his school days, there was the beginning of the 'Great Mass Movement' for the separation of Bodoland as a state, under the leadership of then-President of ABSU, Late Upendra Nath Brahma since 1987. As an active student leader in the field of social movements, he had actively joined the movement along with the fellow students.

His involvement with the mass movement didn't end there, in the latter days when he joined college, he was elected as the President of ABSU, Kamrup District Committee in the year 1997. He was given greater responsibility as a Central Committee member of All Bodo Students Union. He actively worked as the Assistant General Secretary and as the Vice President of the Union before he was elevated to the position of President in the All Bodo Students Union (ABSU). Before he became the President he had actively worked with the Union at the forefront carrying out massive Educational awareness amongst the mass of Bodo people in the entire Assam. During the Presidency of Rwn Gwra Narzary at the central, they started a program called ‘Year of Education’ in 2006, later it continued as the ‘Mission Quality Education’ from 2007. Extensively with an action plan to improve the standard, accessibility, and quality education among the Bodo students in the state.

Pramod Boro as ABSU President 
He was elected as the President of the All Bodo Students Union in 2009, at the Annual Conference held at Thelamara in Sonitpur district of Assam. Ever since he became the President of the Union, he tirelessly dedicated himself to serve the society with a voluntary zeal. His prime importance towards his responsibility was to bring permanent peace to the Bodoland region and to bring change in the society where every human being can live with full freedom and have the right to education and development.

His focus was to establish peace in the region ever since he got the momentum with the observance of 'Arms and Violence Free Society's foundation day observed by ABSU on 15 February 2009. Connecting all the major events observed by the Union as 'Anti Terrorism Day' on 30 July (Since 1996). However, the Bodos being stricken by many education-socio-economic and political issues the Bodo community was not free from various movements in the state.

In December 2010, when the Congress-led UPA II government announced to create a separate state as Telangana, under the Presidency of Pramod Boro the ABSU raised its voice, "If Telangana why not Bodoland". Under the leadership of Pramod Boro as the President, from 2010 onwards the agitation to revive the Bodoland Statehood was decided, and started again as the third phase from the 2nd March 2010, with a huge mass gathering at Kajalgaon Rural Stadium.

He spearheaded this third phase of the Bodoland Movement, where he got a huge response from the Mass. He proposed the Bodoland region boundary from Sonkosh in the West to Sadiya in the East.

Biography 
He has become the fifth Chief Executive Member (CEM) of BTC. He became the longest-serving President of ABSU from 2009 to 2020 (Feb). Under his leadership, in the long Bodoland Movement, there were many upheavals in Bodo politics, ABSU faced many criticisms and threats. Despite such situations, Pramod Boro has boldly continued the effort to bring permanent peace in the region.

Positions held 

 2020–present: Elected as the Chief Executive Member (CEM) of the Bodoland Territorial Council (BTC).
 2020–present: Elected as the president of The United People's Party Liberal (UPPL).
 2009-2020: Elected as the president of All Bodo Students’ Union (ABSU).

Role in signing BTR Accord 2020 
Since 2005, the NDFB has come to a ceasefire with the Government of India and joined the peace process. Unfortunately, in 2008 it was split into two factions NDFB (P) and NDFB (S). Further in continuation of the peace process, the NDFB(P) headed the process of negotiation with the Government of India. During this process of negotiation, the momentum for a Separate Statehood for the Bodos as Bodoland by this armed revolutionary faction got air once again.

Pramod Boro continued to lead the movement along with other leaders of the NDFB(P) in democratic ways such as Mass Gatherings, Seminars, Railway and National Highway Blocked and Indefinite Hunger Strikes. All events were held in the Bodoland region as well as in New Delhi at different times.

This development for a solution to the issue has culminated in the signing of the third Bodo Accord on the 27th of January 2020 along with all the factions of NDFB. This accord has paved the new dawn of hope for the Bodos and people of Assam.

This was a very historic moment for the Bodos and its leaderships coming into a Memorandum of Settlement with the Government of India and Assam. This Accord was welcomed from all sections of people and organizations across the country. A hope for permanent peace was foreseen through this accord as all four factions of the armed revolutionary NDFB had signed this MoS and decided to shun the armed revolution and return to the mainstream.

This MoS was welcomed by more than 7 lakhs people on 7 February 2020 at Kokrajhar, where the Hon’ble Prime Minister Narendra Modi took part and expressed the willingness to implement fully this historic third Bodo Accord and he asserted it to be as the Peace Accord also. In this massive gathering, the Prime Minister of India stated the MoS as the National Commitment to the people of the Bodoland Territorial Region.

References 

 

1975 births
Living people
People from Kokrajhar district
Assam politicians
Bodo nationalism
United People's Party Liberal